Ignacio Manuel Altamirano is a village in Felipe Carrillo Municipality, Quintana Roo, Mexico. It has a 2010 census population of 574 inhabitants, and is situated at 21 meters (69 ft.) above sea level.

References
2010 census tables: INEGI

Populated places in Quintana Roo